Weekly Toyo Keizai ( is a weekly business and finance magazine published in Tokyo, Japan. Founded in 1895 it is one of the earliest business publications in the country.

History and profile
The magazine was established in 1895 under the name Toyo Keizai Shimpo. The magazine modelled on the British business magazine The Economist. Weekly Toyo Keizai is part of the Toyo Keizai Corporation, and its publisher is Toyo Keizai Shinposha. The magazine has its headquarters in Tokyo.

Weekly Toyo Keizai targets business executives, businesspeople, business analysts and investors. In May 1934 the English edition of the magazine, The Oriental Economist, was launched. It became a significant reference point for those who would like to be informed about the economy of Japan. The Oriental Economist was published monthly until January 1946 when the Supreme Commander for the Allied Powers demanded that it should be published on a weekly basis. Its frequency was switched to monthly in August 1952, and The Oriental Economist folded in 1986. It was restarted as a website in October 2015.

Circulation
The magazine sold 108,161 copies in 2006. In 2013 the circulation of Weekly Toyo Keizai was 62,950 copies. It was 61,411 copies in 2014 and 64,185 in 2015.

References

External links
 Official website

1895 establishments in Japan
Business magazines published in Japan
Magazines established in 1895
Magazines published in Tokyo
Monthly magazines published in Japan
Weekly magazines published in Japan